His Majesty's Inspectorate of Constabulary and Fire & Rescue Services (HMICFRS), formerly Her Majesty's Inspectorate of Constabulary (HMIC), has statutory responsibility for the inspection of the police forces of England and Wales, and since July 2017 the fire and rescue services of England. HMICFRS is headed by the Chief Inspector of Constabulary and Chief Inspector of Fire & Rescue Services. It has taken over the responsibilities of His Majesty's Fire Service Inspectorate.

Inspections may also be made, by invitation only, and on a non-statutory basis, of the Police Service of Northern Ireland and other organisations with policing responsibility.

England and Wales
In England and Wales, HMICFRS is responsible to the UK Parliament. The first inspectors were appointed under the County and Borough Police Act 1856; current statutory functions are contained in the Police Act 1996 and related legislation. However, the body's principal statutory functions are unchanged since its establishment in 1856, namely to assess and report on the efficiency and effectiveness of police forces in England and Wales. In July 2017, its remit was expanded to include responsibility to assess and report on the efficiency, effectiveness and leadership of the 45 Fire & Rescue services in England.

The inspectorate is also paid by other departments to report on the activities of non-Home Office bodies involved in law enforcement, such as the British Transport Police, the Civil Nuclear Constabulary, HM Revenue and Customs, the National Crime Agency, the Police Service of Northern Ireland and some overseas police forces.
Reporting has also been performed on a voluntary basis for the Special Investigation Branch (SIB) of the Royal Military Police.  It also receives funding from the Treasury for its work on HMRC.

As a public authority, decisions and actions of HMICFRS are susceptible to judicial review.

Personnel 
HM Chief Inspector of Fire & Rescue Services is Andy Cooke, former chief constable of Merseyside Police,
who was appointed in April 2022.
His predecessor was the lawyer and former rail regulator Tom Winsor, who took office on 1 October 2012 as the first chief inspector to be appointed from outside the police service. Before Winsor, the chief inspector was former Surrey Police Chief Constable, Sir Denis O'Connor, in post from 2008 until his retirement in 2012.

In addition to the Chief Inspector of Constabulary, there are three Inspectors of Constabulary and Fire & Rescue Services: Roy Wilsher, former chief fire officer in Hertfordshire; Matt Parr, formerly a Rear-Admiral in the Royal Navy; and Wendy Williams, formerly Chief Crown Prosecutor of CPS Direct. Appointments follow the Code of Practice of the Office of the Commissioner for Public Appointments.

Northern Ireland
Inspections of the Police Service of Northern Ireland (PSNI) have been made in recent years by invitation, on a non-statutory basis. The Police (Northern Ireland) Act 1998 allows HMIC to perform inspection and assessment of services or projects by direction of the Secretary of State for Northern Ireland. At the request of the chief constable of the PSNI, in 2013 the inspectorate published a report into Northern Ireland's Historical Enquiries Team.

List of chief inspectors
Inspectors of Constabulary for England and Wales from 1856:

 Captain Francis J. Parry, to 1900
 Captain Herbert D. Terry, from 1900

The first chief inspector was appointed in 1962.

 Sir William Johnson, 19621963
 Sir Edward Dodd, 19631966
 Colonel Sir Eric St Johnston, 19671970
 Sir John McKay, 19701972
 Sir John Hill, 19721975
 Sir James Haughton, 19761977
 Sir Colin Woods, 19771979
 Sir James Crane, 19791982
 Sir Lawrence Byford, 19831987
 Sir Richard Barrett, 19871990
 Sir John Woodcock, 19901993
 Sir Trefor Morris, 19931996
 Sir David O'Dowd, 19962001
 Sir Keith Povey 20022005
 Sir Ronnie Flanagan, 20052009
 Sir Denis O'Connor, 20092012
 Sir Thomas Winsor, 20122022
 Andy Cooke, 2022present

In July 2017, the role became Chief Inspector of Constabulary and Chief Inspector of Fire & Rescue Services. The incumbent is Andy Cooke, who was appointed in April 2022.

2021 protest report
In March 2021, HMICFRS published a report that endorsed a proposed clampdown on protests. In response to the report, a whistleblower alleged that its authors had reached conclusions favouring the government's view prior to gathering and assessing evidence, in breach of the civil service code.

References

External links 
 

1856 establishments in England
1856 establishments in Wales
Home Office (United Kingdom)
Public bodies and task forces of the United Kingdom government